Vicente Rodrigo Cisneros Durán (23 February 1934 – 29 December 2017) was an Ecuadorian Roman Catholic archbishop.

Cisneros Durán was ordained to the priesthood in 1957. He subsequently served as an auxiliary bishop of the Roman Catholic Archdiocese of Guayaquil from 1967 to 1969, diocesan bishop of the Roman Catholic Diocese of Ambato from 1969 to 2000 and archbishop of the Roman Catholic Archdiocese of Cuenca from 2000 to 2009. He died on 29 December 2017, aged 83.

Notes

1934 births
2017 deaths
20th-century Roman Catholic bishops in Ecuador
21st-century Roman Catholic archbishops in Ecuador
Roman Catholic archbishops of Cuenca
Roman Catholic bishops of Guayaquil
Roman Catholic bishops of Ambato